Lukhang (Tib. klu khang, residence of Nagas), formally Zongdag Lukhang (Tib. rdzong bdag klu khang [?], residence of Nagas, lords of the castle and administered territory [?]) is the name of a secret temple of Lozang Gyatso, 5th Dalai Lama. Three walls of the temple are covered with murals of yogis engaged in their exercises.

 One wall of murals illustrates a commentary by Longchenpa on a Dzogchen tantra Rigpa Rangshar, interpreted according to the 5th Dalai Lama's experience of practice. The murals show characteristic visions of the secret practice of tögal.
 Another wall shows eight manifestations of Guru Padmasambhava and eighty four main Mahasiddhas.
 The third wall illustrates positions and movements of Yantra Yoga.

The temple is situated on a small island on a lake behind the Potala palace in Lhasa.

References
The Crystal and The Way of Light. Sutra, Tantra and Dzogchen by Chögyal Namkhai Norbu. Compiled and Edited by John Shane, Snow Lion Publications, Ithaca, NY, USA, 2000, pp. 82–87, 190, 191.

The Dalai Lama's Secret Temple: Tantric wall paintings from Tibet, Ian A.Baker; Thames & Hudson, Year: 2011,

External links
http://www.asianart.com/articles/baker/ The Lukhang: a hidden temple in Tibet
http://www.asianart.com/shalu/lukhang/ SHALU Association: THE LUKHANG TEMPLE

Tibetan Buddhist temples